The Estonia Rugby League Federation was the governing body for the sport of rugby league football in Estonia. The Association was formed during 1999 and dissolved in 2012.

See also

 Rugby league in Estonia
 Estonia national rugby league team

References

Rugby league in Estonia
Rugby League
Rugby league governing bodies in Europe
Sports organizations established in 1999
1999 establishments in Estonia
2012 disestablishments in Estonia
Organizations disestablished in 2012